Martin Courtney IV (born September 28, 1985) is an American musician and the frontman of the American indie rock band Real Estate.

In 2015, Courtney also released his first solo album, Many Moons,  followed by his second solo album, Magic Sign, in 2022.

Early life and personal life
Courtney was born as Martin Courtney IV in Ridgewood, New Jersey, the son of Martin Courtney III and Mary Ellen Courtney. He attended Ridgewood High School with current Real Estate bandmate Alex Bleeker and former bandmate Matt Mondanile. After graduating from high school, he studied at The Evergreen State College in Olympia, Washington, where his focus was "mostly literature." Courtney's parents run a real estate business, which inspired the name of the band. Courtney spent a short time as the keyboardist for indie punk rock group Titus Andronicus from the neighboring town Glen Rock, New Jersey in 2006.

Courtney married his wife in Ridgewood on October 13, 2012, following Real Estate's tour for 2011's Days. They have since had a daughter. He currently resides in upstate New York with his family.

Courtney released his first solo album, Many Moons, on October 30, 2015, to critical acclaim. This was followed by his second solo release Magic Sign, on June 24, 2022.

Discography
with Real Estate
Real Estate (2009)
Days (2011)
Atlas (2014)
In Mind (2017)
The Main Thing (2020)

Solo
Many Moons (2015)
Magic Sign (2022)

References

External links
 Official website

1985 births
Living people
Singers from New Jersey
Evergreen State College alumni
American indie rock musicians
American male guitarists
21st-century American singers
Domino Recording Company artists
People from Ridgewood, New Jersey
Ridgewood High School (New Jersey) alumni
21st-century American guitarists
Guitarists from New Jersey
Real Estate (band) members
21st-century American male singers